SS Flickertail State (T-ACS-5) is a crane ship in ready reserve for the United States Navy.  She is stationed at Newport News, Virginia and is in ready reserve under the Military Sealift Command (MSC).  The ship was named for the state of North Dakota, which is also known as the Flickertail State.

History 
Flickertail State was laid down on 14 February 1967, as the container ship CV Lightning, ON 518063, IMO 6817845, a Maritime Administration type (C5-S-73b) hull under MARAD contract (MA 206). Built by Bath Iron Works, Bath, Maine, hull no. 355, she was launched on 11 May 1968, and delivered to MARAD 21 February 1969, entering service for American Export-Isbrandtsen Lines.  She was sold to Farrell Lines in 1978 without name change. The ship was returned to MARAD in 1986 and laid up in the National Defense Reserve Fleet (NDRF). In 1987-1988 she was converted to a type (C5-S-MA73c) Crane Ship by Norfolk Shipbuilding & Drydock, Norfolk, Virginia. Completed on 8 February 1988, she was placed in service as SS Flickertail State (T-ACS-5) and assigned to the Ready Reserve Force (RRF), under operation control of the Military Sealift Command (MSC).

Flickertail State was assigned to Maritime Prepositioning Ship Squadron Three and was maintained in a four-day readiness status. Flickertail State has been in ready reserve at Newport News, Virginia since 1993.

Large vessel interface lift on/lift off
In 2009, a demonstrator crane was installed and integrated aboard the SS Flickertail State to evaluate the crane's performance in transporting containers between two moving ships in an operational environment using commercial and oil industry at-sea mooring techniques, at sea in the Gulf of Mexico. Developed by the Sea Warfare and Weapons Department in the Office of Naval Research along with Oceaneering International, the LVI Lo/Lo crane has sensors and cameras as well as motion-sensing algorithms that let it automatically shift with the rolling and pitching of the sea, making it much easier for operators to center the crane over cargo and transfer it.

See also
Operation Steel Box

References

Notes

Bibliography

Online 
 United States Navy Fact File - Crane Ships

External links

 Military Sealift Command page on Flickertail State
 
 Global Security.org - T-ACS Keystone State Auxiliary Crane Ships
 Global Security.org - T-ACS Keystone State Auxiliary Crane Ships specifications 
 Navsource.org
 National Defense Reserve Fleet Inventory

 

Ships built in Bath, Maine
1968 ships
Gopher State-class crane ships
Ships of American Export-Isbrandtsen Lines
Type C5 ships